Sri Guru Gobind Singh College, Patna is a degree college in Bihar, India. It is a constituent unit of Patliputra University. College offers Senior secondary education and Undergraduate degree in Arts, Science and conducts some vocational courses.

History 
College was established in 1960. It became a constituent unit of Patliputra University in 2018.

Degrees and courses 
College offers the following degrees and courses.

 Bachelor's degree
 Bachelor of Arts
 Bachelor of Commerce
 Bachelor of Science

 Vocational 
 Bachelor of business management
 Bachelor of computer application

References

External links 

 Patliputra University website

Constituent colleges of Patliputra University
Educational institutions established in 1960
Universities and colleges in Patna
1960 establishments in Bihar